Djimara is a village in the historical region of Khevi, north-eastern Georgia. It is located on the confluence of the rivers Tergi and Djimaradoni, on the southern slopes of the Khokh Range. Administratively, it is part of the Kazbegi Municipality in Mtskheta-Mtianeti. Distance to the municipality center Stepantsminda is 42 km.

See also 
 Mount Dzhimara

Sources 
 Georgian Soviet Encyclopedia, V. 11, p. 565, Tbilisi, 1987 year.

References

Kobi Community villages